Events from the year 1764 in Ireland.

Incumbent
Monarch: George III

Events
3 January – the Brooke Baronetcy, of Colebrooke in the County of Fermanagh, is created in the Baronetage of Ireland for Arthur Brooke, a member of the Irish House of Commons.
Old Moore's Almanac first published by Theophilus Moore of Milltown, Dublin.

Arts and literature
The English-born painter William Ashford arrives in Dublin; he will spend most of the rest of his life in Ireland.

Births
15 February – Charles MacCarthy, soldier in the French, Dutch and British armies, governor in British West Africa (died 1824).
24 April – Thomas Addis Emmet, lawyer, politician and United Irishman (died 1827 in the United States).
1 June – Marcus Beresford, soldier and politician (died 1803).
30 June – Charles Bury, 1st Earl of Charleville, politician (died 1835).
21 August – Joseph Rogers, settler in the United States (died 1833).
25 August – James Hope, a leader of the United Irishmen in the Irish Rebellion of 1798 and insurrection of 1803 (died 1847).
Arthur French, politician (died 1820).
Charles O'Conor, priest and scholar (died 1828).
Henry Charles Sirr, soldier (died 1841).

Deaths
16 April – Warden Flood, judge (born 1694).
19 December – George Stone, Archbishop of Armagh (Church of Ireland) (born 1708).

 
Years of the 18th century in Ireland
Ireland
1760s in Ireland